Lesmurdie is a suburb of Perth, Western Australia, located within the City of Kalamunda. It was established in 1897 by Archibald Sanderson, a politician and journalist, who began buying properties in the area from the Canning Jarrah Timber Company to build up a rural retreat and fruit-growing property. He named it after Lesmurdie Cottage, a shooting box near Dufftown, Scotland that his father had rented. It was officially gazetted on 8 June 1959.

It is viewed as being a rival suburb  to the neighbouring suburb of Kalamunda directly to the north. The main access to the suburb from the Swan Coastal Plain is via Welshpool Road East, which snakes its way up the side of the Darling Scarp from the suburb of Wattle Grove. Lesmurdie can also be accessed from Kalamunda, Walliston, Carmel and Bickley, primarily through Canning Road.

The shopping centres in the area are the Lesmurdie Village on Sanderson Road and the Lesmurdie Road Shopping Centre on the corner of Rooth Road and Lesmurdie Road.

Lesmurdie has three high schools within its boundaries, the government operated Lesmurdie Senior High School as well as the privately operated Mazenod College for boys and St Brigid's College for girls.
There are two government primary schools in Lesmurdie, Lesmurdie Primary School and Falls Road Primary School as well as a privately operated primary school at St Brigid's.

See also
 Mundy Regional Park

References

 
Suburbs of Perth, Western Australia
Suburbs in the City of Kalamunda